In music, counterpoint is a texture involving the simultaneous sounding of separate melodies or lines "against" each other.

Counterpoint may also refer to:

Music
 Counterpoint (Jason Webley album), 2002
 Counterpoint (In the Nursery album), 1989
 Counterpoints (Argent album), 1975
 Counterpoints (McCoy Tyner album), 2004
 Counterpoint (Schenker), the second volume of Heinrich Schenker's New Musical Theories and Fantasies
 "Counterpoint",  a song by Delphic from the album Acolyte

Film, television and radio
 Counterpoint (radio programme), a musical quiz show on BBC Radio 4
 "Counterpoint" (Star Trek: Voyager), a 1998 episode from the fifth season of Star Trek: Voyager
 Counterpoint (Radio National), an Australian Broadcasting Corporation radio program
 Counterpoint (film), a 1968 war film starring Charlton Heston
 Counterpoint (TV series), a Canadian current affairs television series on CBC Television in 1967

Other
 Counterpoint (horse), a thoroughbred racehorse
 Counterpoint (publisher), an American publishing house

See also
 ContraPoints, a YouTube channel
 "Point/Counterpoint", a segment on CBS News' 60 Minutes (1971–1979)
 "Point/Counterpoint", a parody of the 60 Minutes segment on Saturday Night Lives Weekend Update
Point Counter Point, a 1928 novel by Aldous Huxley
 "Point/Counterpoint", a song by Streetlight Manifesto from the album Everything Goes Numb
 Counterplot (disambiguation)